The Journal of Interdisciplinary Economics is a peer-reviewed academic journal covering economics.

Abstracting and indexing
The journal is abstracted and indexed in Scopus, Research Papers in Economics, and ProQuest databases.

References

Economics journals
Publications established in 1985
Quarterly journals
SAGE Publishing academic journals